The Save A Brain Foundation is a 501(c)(3) non-profit organization with the goals of raising awareness of glioblastoma multiforme (GBM), the most common type of primary brain tumor, as well as raising money in hopes of finding a cure for this terminal disease. To date, the foundation has raised tens of thousands of dollars for brain cancer research.

Origin
The plan to establish the foundation came about in January 2008, after three friends who had recently graduated from the University of Southern California decided to create the foundation as a means of helping combat GBM. The cofounders of the foundation are George Kohan, Isaac Meier, and Samuel Zidovetzki. At the time, Isaac's father had recently been diagnosed with GBM, which served as the impetus for the establishment of the foundation.

Fundraising events
The foundation has hosted multiple fundraising events throughout the United States, including notable events in New York and California.

One of the foundation's first major fundraising events, "Bowling for Brains", was hosted in April 2009 at the Lucky Strike Lanes in Manhattan, New York. This event served as the first substantial opportunity for the foundation to make its existence and goals known to the general public. The success of this event ensured its recurrence on an annual basis for years to come.

Another notable fundraising event took place on September 3, 2009, at the Hollywood Bowl in Los Angeles, California, where 'Russian Romantics with the Los Angeles Philharmonic' was the performance for the evening.

Smaller, more frequent, events include biweekly visits to the University of Southern California's University Park campus. At these events, representatives of the foundation hand out brochures, flyers, and other materials which highlight the foundation's activities and future goals, and recruit students and professors to help achieve these goals.

Associations
The foundation works closely with several physicians and physician scientists, including Dr. Thomas C. Chen from the University of Southern California. Chen specializes in neuro-oncology, treating a wide range of brain and spinal cord tumors. His laboratory emphasizes translating new research findings into clinical trials, with efforts at developing novel therapies aimed at targeting tumor cells specifically for destruction, with minimal damage to normal cells.

References

Cancer charities in the United States
Neurosurgery organizations
Cancer research
Brain tumor
Medical and health organizations based in California